Keoni Beau DeRenne (born April 30, 1979) is an American professional baseball coach for the Kansas City Royals of Major League Baseball.

DeRenne attended ʻIolani School in Honolulu, Hawaii, graduating in 1997. He enrolled at the University of Arizona, where he played college baseball for the Arizona Wildcats, where he was named to the All-Pac-10 Conference team as a shortstop. The Atlanta Braves selected DeRenne in the 12th round of the 2000 MLB draft, and he played in Minor League Baseball for the Braves, New York Yankees, Arizona Diamondbacks, Boston Red Sox, and Philadelphia Phillies organizations for eight seasons, followed by another three seasons in independent league baseball.

In 2012, DeRenne became a coach. After coaching in the Pittsburgh Pirates and Chicago Cubs organizations, he joined the Kansas City Royals organization for the 2020 season. The Royals named him their assistant hitting coach after the 2021 season.

His great grandfather was Wilbur Cooper.

References

External links

Living people
1979 births
Sportspeople from Honolulu
Arizona Wildcats baseball players
Kansas City Royals coaches
Major League Baseball hitting coaches
Jamestown Jammers players
Macon Braves players
Greenville Braves players
Trenton Thunder players
Lancaster JetHawks players
Tucson Sidewinders players
El Paso Diablos players
Portland Sea Dogs players
Gulf Coast Red Sox players
Pawtucket Red Sox players
York Revolution players
Reading Phillies players
Clearwater Threshers players
Lakewood BlueClaws players
Lehigh Valley IronPigs players
Baseball players from Honolulu